LeRoy Frederich Heminger (1914 – March 27, 1977) was an American football coach and college athletics administrator.  He served as the head football coach at Shurtleff College in Alton, Illinois from 1946 to 1948 and Franklin College in Franklin, Indiana from 1949 to 1952. Heminger was the athletic director at Paoli High School in Paoli, Indiana from 1938 until 1941, when he was hired by Shurtleff College.  He also coached basketball and track at Shurtleff before he was hired in 1949 by Franklin College to coach football, baseball, and golf.

Heminger was a graduate of Franklin College. He died on March 27, 1977, at Johnson Country Memorial Hospital in Franklin.

Head coaching record

College football

References

External links
 

1914 births
1977 deaths
Franklin Grizzlies baseball coaches
Franklin Grizzlies football coaches
Shurtleff Pioneers athletic directors
Shurtleff Pioneers football coaches
College golf coaches in the United States
College men's basketball head coaches in the United States
College track and field coaches in the United States
High school basketball coaches in the United States
Franklin College (Indiana) alumni
Indiana University alumni